The South East Texas Regional Planning Commission (SETRPC) is a voluntary association of cities, counties and special districts in Southeast Texas.  It provides support to its members in several areas including grant and budget administration, aging assistance, community development, disaster recovery, emergency communications, children at risk, Homeland Security initiatives, public safety liaison services, substance abuse prevention coordination, transportation, and environmental services.

Based in Beaumont, the South East Texas Regional Planning Commission is a member of the Texas Association of Regional Councils.

Counties served
Harris
Jefferson
Orange
Jasper

Largest cities in the region
Beaumont
Port Arthur
Orange
Nederland
Groves
Port Neches
Vidor
Lumberton

References

External links
South East Texas Regional Planning Commission - Official site.

Texas Association of Regional Councils